Haapsalu-Noarootsi Wetland Complex is a wetland complex in Lääne County, Estonia. Since 2011, this complex belongs to Ramsar sites.

The area of the complex is 27,450 ha.
It also includes Osmussaar Landscape Conservation Area.
This complex is important wintering, staging, moulting and breeding site for 225 different bird species.

References

Lääne County
Bogs of Estonia
Ramsar sites in Estonia